ABD ehk Luggemise-Ramat Lastele ("ABD or the Book Reading for Children" in English) is an Estonian alphabet book by Otto Wilhelm Masing published in Tartu in 1795.

The work is the first Estonian language book with a title page. For the first time, the book included a guide on how to teach reading. In the Estonian language, the abbreviation "ABC" is not used for the alphabet, because the letter C does not appear in the Estonian vocabulary.

See also
 Estonian orthography

References

External links
 ABD ehk Luggemise-Ramat Lastele kes tahawad luggema öppida at DSpace of the University of Tartu
 ABD ehk Luggemise-Ramat Lastele (1795) at EEVA

1795 non-fiction books
Alphabet books
Education in Estonia
Estonian literature